The 1897 Nevada State Sagebrushers football team was an American football team that represented Nevada State University (now known as the University of Nevada, Reno) as an independent during the 1897 college football season. The Sagebrushers were led by William H. Harrelson in his first and only year as head coach.

Schedule

References

Nevada State
Nevada Wolf Pack football seasons
College football winless seasons
Nevada State Sagebrushers football